Cape Reinga (sometimes spelled Rēinga), and officially Cape Reinga / Te Rerenga Wairua, is the northwesternmost tip of the Aupouri Peninsula, at the northern end of the North Island of New Zealand. Cape Reinga is more than 100 km north of the nearest small town of Kaitaia. State Highway 1 extends all the way to the cape, but until 2010 was unsealed gravel road for the last 19 km. Suitable vehicles can also travel much of the way via Ninety Mile Beach and Kauaeparaoa Stream (Te Paki Stream) stream bed. It is also the northern terminus of Te Araroa.

In Māori,  means the leaping-off place of spirits.  is the Māori word for underworld. Both refer to the Māori belief that the cape is the point where the spirits of the dead enter the underworld.

Cape Reinga is on the tentative list of UNESCO waiting to receive World Heritage Site status. , the cape is already a favourite tourist attraction, with over 120,000 visitors a year and around 1,300 cars arriving per day during peak season. Visitor numbers are growing by about five percent a year, and the increase is likely to become even more now that the road to the cape is fully sealed.

Meeting of the seas

Cape Reinga is generally considered the separation marker between the Tasman Sea to the west and the Pacific Ocean to the east. From the lighthouse it is possible to watch the tidal race, as the two seas clash to create unsettled waters just off the coast. The Māori refer to this as the meeting of Te Moana-a-Rehua, 'the sea of Rehua' with Te Tai-o-Whitirea, 'the sea of Whitirea', Rehua and Whitirea being a male and a female respectively.

The cape is often mistakenly thought of as being the northernmost point of the North Island, and thus, of mainland New Zealand. However, North Cape's Surville Cliffs, 30 km east of Cape Reinga are 3 km further north. Another headland just to the west of Cape Reinga is Cape Maria van Diemen, which was named by the Dutch explorer Abel Tasman during his journey in 1642 and thought of by him to be the northernmost point of the newly discovered country he named 'Staten Landt'.

Māori mythology
According to mythology, the spirits of the dead travel to Cape Reinga on their journey to the afterlife to leap off the headland and climb the roots of the 800-year-old pōhutukawa tree and descend to the underworld to return to their traditional homeland of Hawaiki, using the Te Ara Wairua, the 'Spirits' pathway'. At Cape Reinga they depart the mainland. They turn briefly at the Three Kings Islands for one last look back towards the land, then continue on their journey.

A spring in the hillside, Te Waiora-a-Tāne (the 'Living waters of Tāne'), also played an important role in Māori ceremonial burials, representing a spiritual cleansing of the spirits, with water of the same name used in burial rites all over New Zealand. This significance lasted until the local population mostly converted to Christianity, and the spring was capped with a reservoir, with little protest from the mostly converted population of the area. However, the spring soon disappeared and only reappeared at the bottom of the cliff, making the reservoir useless.

Restoration 

In 2007 protests by Māori and increased tourist numbers led the Department of Conservation to announce that the public carpark and toilet facilities, which intrude on traditionally sacred ground, would be moved further away from the cape and extended, at a cost of NZ$6.5 million (for details, see external links below). The road to the cape, one of the last stretches of State Highway 1, was only recently sealed following three years of work and include extensive roadside revegetation with over 150,000 plants to prevent erosion. In March 2009, the works on the visitor facilities were completed.

Climate
Cape Reinga has a very mild oceanic climate (Cfb) with high precipitation and little temperature difference between the seasons.

Lighthouse

The lighthouse at Cape Reinga was built in 1941 and first lit during May of that year, replacing a lighthouse located on nearby Motuopao Island, which had been built 1879. In 1987, the lighthouse was fully automated and the lighthouse keepers were withdrawn. The previous 1000 watt light and its revolving Fresnel lens have since been replaced with a tiny 50 watt flashing beacon, lodged in their place in the huge lantern.

References

External links

Cape Reinga (from the New Zealand Department of Conservation (DOC) website)
Cape Reinga (from Eske Family Trust website, see the Maori Mythology explanation)

Far North District
Reinga
State Highway 1 (New Zealand)